John Joe McGirl (25 March 1921 – 8 December 1988) was an Irish republican, a Sinn Féin politician, and a former chief of staff of the Irish Republican Army (IRA).

Biography

Anti-Treaty IRA
He was born and raised in Ballinamore, County Leitrim, the son of Joseph McGirl, a farmer, and Bridget McGirl (née Gallagher). McGirl became involved with the Irish Republican Army (IRA) in the 1930s. McGirl was trained for the 1939–1940 sabotage/ bombing attack on British soil - the S-Plan. He was arrested along with Cathal Goulding and ten others in April 1946. McGirl was sentenced to 12 months in prison for IRA membership spending his prison time in the "Glasshouse" building of the Curragh Internment Camp. 

McGirl participated in the IRA Border campaign. In January 1957, he was tried and convicted at Ballinamore courthouse and imprisoned in Mountjoy Prison.

Although a prisoner, he was elected as a Sinn Féin Teachta Dála (TD) for the Sligo–Leitrim constituency at the 1957 general election, topping the poll with 7,007 votes (15.7%). Running on an abstentionist ticket, Sinn Féin won four seats at the general election (also Eighneachán Ó hAnnluain, Ruairí Ó Brádaigh and John Joe Rice). McGirl did not retain his seat at the 1961 general election. His share of the vote was halved and he received only 2,487 votes (7.3%).

In November 1957, he delivered the oration at the funerals of some of the "Edentubber martyrs", four IRA members who were killed when a bomb they were preparing accidentally exploded. In 1962, he served on the committee that founded St. Felim's College, Ballinamore.

Provisionals
When the IRA split in 1969, between Official IRA and Provisional IRA factions, McGirl sided with the Provisionals, who were committed to launching an armed campaign against British rule in Northern Ireland. He was interned in Northern Ireland in 1974.

McGirl contested the February 1982 and 1987 general elections for Sligo–Leitrim. In the former contest, he received 2,772 votes (6.1%) and in the latter, 2,627 votes (5.7%).

McGirl served as vice-president of Sinn Féin. Originally he was opposed to the dropping of the Éire Nua policy and was considered an ally of Ruairí Ó Brádaigh (who later founded Republican Sinn Féin). However, at the 1986 Sinn Féin Ardfheis, McGirl supported the moves of Gerry Adams and Martin McGuinness to drop the policy of abstentionism, greatly angering his contemporaries Ó Brádaigh and Dáithí Ó Conaill.

McGirl was a publican, undertaker and bicycle-repairer in Ballinamore. He was elected a Sinn Féin councillor to Leitrim County Council in 1960, serving as chairperson of that body. He was still a member of the council at the time of his death. After his death, a monument was erected to McGirl in his native town of Ballinamore. It is located on the bridge crossing the Shannon–Erne Waterway.

A nephew, Francis McGirl, was charged but acquitted of the murder of Lord Mountbatten, who was killed by the IRA when his boat was bombed off the Sligo coast in 1979. John Joe's son, Liam McGirl, was co-opted on to Leitrim County Council in 1988 after his father's death.

References

1921 births
1988 deaths
Irish Republican Army (1922–1969) members
Irish republicans
Members of the 16th Dáil
Local councillors in County Leitrim
Politicians from County Leitrim
Provisional Irish Republican Army members
Republicans imprisoned during the Northern Ireland conflict
Sinn Féin TDs (post-1923)
People from Ballinamore